Shanghai University of Engineering Science (SUES) is a public university located in Shanghai, China. It was originally established in 1978 under the name of Shanghai Jiao Tong University Electrical & Mechanical Branch and merged with a branch of the East China Textile Institute of Science and Technology in 1985. 

The most distinguished subjects of SUES include materials science, mechanical engineering, management studies, art design, etc.

History

In October, 1978, Shanghai Jiao Tong University, the First Bureau of Shanghai Mechanical and Electrical Industry, the Second Bureau of Shanghai Mechanical and Electrical Industry, Jiangnan Shipyard, East-China Electric Management Bureau, Transportation Bureau, the government of Changning District, Shanghai co-founded Shanghai Jiao Tong University Electrical and Mechanical Branch. East-China Textile Institute of Science and Technology, Textile Industry Bureau of Shanghai, the government of Putuo District, Shanghai, co-founded a branch of East-China Textile Institute of Science and Technology.

Teaching and research
There was no English-based engineering undergraduate programs available before 2020. All engineering courses were in Chinese
In 2020, 3 majors was added as English taught Majors for International students.

References

External links
Official site

Universities and colleges in Shanghai
1978 establishments in China
Educational institutions established in 1978